The 1914 Brown Bears football team was an American football team that represented Brown University as an independent during the 1914 college football season. In its 13th season under head coach Edward N. Robinson, the team compiled a 5–2–2 record and outscored opponents by a total of 105 to 65. The team played its home games at Andrews Field in Providence, Rhode Island.

Schedule

Gallery

References

Brown
Brown Bears football seasons
Brown Bears football